Lasse Ankjær (born March 30, 1983) is a Danish football forward, who plays for the Danish 1st Division club Hobro IK.

External links

Living people
1983 births
Danish men's footballers
Association football forwards
People from Kalundborg
Danish 1st Division players
Viborg FF players
Silkeborg IF players
Skive IK players
Hobro IK players
Sportspeople from Region Zealand